Annamarie Jagose (born 1965) is an LGBT academic and writer of fictional works.

Life and career
Jagose was born in Ashburton, New Zealand in 1965.  She gained her PhD (Victoria University of Wellington) in 1992, and worked in the Department of English with Cultural Studies at the University of Melbourne before returning to New Zealand in 2003, where she was a Professor in the Department of Film, Television and Media Studies at the University of Auckland and Head of the Department from 2008 to 2010.

From 2011 to 2016 she was Head of the School of Literature, Art and Media at the University of Sydney and in 2017 she took up the role of Dean of the Faculty of Arts and Social Sciences at the University of Sydney. She has been the subject of recent controversy in her administrative position at the University of Sydney for initiating a restructure of the University in light of the coronavirus pandemic, which could see 30% of staff made redundant.

Awards and honours
 1994 won NZSA Best First Book Award for In Translation
 2004 won Deutz Medal for Fiction in the Montana New Zealand Book Awards for Slow Water
 2004 winner of the Vance Palmer Prize for Fiction for Slow Water
 2004 was shortlisted for the Australian Miles Franklin Literary Award for Slow Water
 2004 won Deutz Medal for Fiction for Slow Water at the Montana New Zealand Book Awards
 2015 elected Fellow of the Australian Academy of the Humanities

Selected works
 Lesbian Utopics (New York: Routledge, 1994)
 In Translation (Wellington: Victoria University Press and Sydney: Allen and Unwin, 1994)
 Queer Theory: An Introduction (New York: New York University Press, 1996)
 Lulu: A Romance (Wellington: Victoria University Press and Sydney: Allen and Unwin, 1998)
 Inconsequence: Lesbian Representation and the Logic of Sexual Sequence (Ithaca: Cornell University Press, 2002)
 Slow Water (Wellington: Victoria University Press and Sydney: Random House, 2003)
 Orgasmology (Durham: Duke University Press, 2013)

References

External links
 Annamarie Jagose, profile at the University of Sydney

1965 births
Living people
Lesbian novelists
New Zealand lesbian writers
New Zealand LGBT novelists
People from Ashburton, New Zealand
New Zealand women novelists
Queer women
Queer novelists
Queer theorists
Academic staff of the University of Auckland
Victoria University of Wellington alumni
20th-century New Zealand novelists
21st-century New Zealand novelists
21st-century New Zealand women writers